The 2023 4 Hours of Dubai was an endurance sportscar racing event held between 10 and 12 February 2023, as the first and second round of 2023 Asian Le Mans Series season.

Schedule

Free practice 
 Only the fastest car in each class is shown.

Race 1

Qualifying 
Pole position winners in each class are marked in bold.

Race

Race result 
The minimum number of laps for classification (70% of overall winning car's distance) was 82 laps. Class winners are marked in  bold.

Statistics

Fastest lap

Race 2

Qualifying 
Pole position winners in each class are marked in bold.

Race

Race result 
The minimum number of laps for classification (70% of overall winning car's distance) was 80 laps. Class winners are marked in  bold.

Statistics

Fastest lap

References 

Dubai
Dubai